The Llanwrtyd Wells television relay station is sited on high ground by the hamlet of Cefn Gorwydd to the east of the village of Llanwrtyd Wells in Powys, mid Wales. It was originally built in the 1980s as a fill-in relay for UHF analogue television covering the communities of Llanwrtyd Wells, Cefn Gorwydd and the surrounding area. The transmissions are beamed broadly northwest and northeast to cover its targets. The Llanwrtyd Wells transmission station is owned and operated by Arqiva.

When it came, the digital switchover process for Llanwrtyd Wells duplicated the timing at Carmel with the first stage taking place on 26 August 2009 and with the second stage being completed on 23 September 2009. After the switchover process, analogue channels had ceased broadcasting permanently and the Freeview digital TV services were radiated at an ERP of 2 W each.

Channels listed by frequency

Analogue television

1980's - 26 August 2009
Being in Wales, Llanwrtyd Wells transmitted Channel 4

Analogue and digital television

26 August 2009 - 23 September 2009
The UK's digital switchover commenced at Carmel (and therefore at Llanwrtyd Wells and all its other relays) on 26 August 2009. Analogue BBC Two Wales on channel 27 was first to close, and ITV Wales was moved from channel 24 to channel 27 for its last month of service. Channel 24 was replaced by the new digital BBC A mux which started up in 64-QAM and at full power (i.e. 2 W).

Digital television

23 September 2009 - present
The remaining analogue TV services were closed down and the digital multiplexes took over on the original analogue channels' frequencies.

References

External links
The Transmission Gallery: Llanwrtyd Wells

Transmitter sites in Wales
Carmel UHF 625-line Transmitter Group